The MGM Rewards All-Star Legends and Celebrity Softball Game is an annual game that brings former Major League Baseball all-stars and celebrities together in a friendly exhibition. The game is played the day before the Home Run Derby. It has been sponsored by RadioShack and Taco Bell; since 2022, MGM Resorts   sponsors.

The game started in 2001 in Seattle and is played at the site of that year's All-Star Game. It is broadcast on tape delay on MLB Network. The current broadcast team is Robert Flores and Lauren Gardner.

Rules
From 2001 to 2006, the game used standard softball rules with a temporary wall [ from home plate] on the field. In 2007 & since 2022, the rules were changed. Instead of 7 innings, there are only 5 innings with everyone on the team batting, whether or not they are in the field. From 2008 to 2012, it is unknown how long the game lasted. From 2013 to 2019 & 2021, six innings were played. A 2022 rule change saw a 10-batter limit or three outs, whichever comes first, to conclude innings (which won't apply to final inning of regulation, if trailing team is behind). In place of extra innings, a swing-off was introduced. If the teams were tied at the end of 5 innings, managers from each team would pick three batters, who'll get one swing each. Whoever hits the most home runs in the 3 rounds will win and get credited one run & hit each; otherwise, teams play sudden-death rounds until one team hits a home run.

Game Summaries

2001
The 2001 RadioShack Legends and Celebrity Softball Game was played on Sunday, July 8, 2001 at Safeco Field in Seattle, Washington. ESPN broadcast the game after the Home Run Derby. For this game the teams are named after specialty coffee drinks as a nod to the coffee industry in Seattle.

Lineups

2002
The 2002 Radioshack Legends and Celebrity Softball Game was played on Sunday, July 7, 2002 at Miller Park in Milwaukee, Wisconsin. ESPN broadcast the game after the Home Run Derby with commentators Dave O'Brien and Rick Sutcliffe. Managers Kenny Mayne and Harold Reynolds also provided on field reporting. Pitcher Dave Winfield had a no-hitter going until the bottom of the third inning when Dale Earnhardt Jr. broke it up with a lead off single. Harold Reynolds' Brew Crew won the game 7–4.

Lineups

2003
The 2003 Radioshack Legends and Celebrity Softball Game was played on Sunday, July 13, 2003 at U.S. Cellular Field in Chicago. ESPN broadcast the game after the Home Run Derby with commentators Dave O'Brien and Rick Sutcliffe. Managers Kenny Mayne and Harold Reynolds also provided on field reporting. In the bottom of the third inning, as The Bachelor star Andrew Firestone came to bat, manager Kenny Mayne brought in Firestone's then fiancé from the show, Jen Schefft, to pitch. Firestone popped out to the shortstop and the original pitcher was brought back in. In the next at bat Jimmy Kimmel singled but first baseman Bo Jackson successfully pulled the hidden ball trick on him to record an out. In the top of the fourth inning Jackson came to bat with a wooden bat that had pine tar on it that he claimed was given to him by George Brett. Manager Harold Reynolds challenged the amount of pine tar on the bat but the home plate umpire allowed it and Jackson then hit a home run. Kenny Mayne's Go-Go Sox won the game 7–4.

Lineups

2004
The 2004 Taco Bell Legends and Celebrity Softball Game was played on Sunday, July 11, 2004 at Minute Maid Park in Houston, Texas. ESPN broadcast the game after the Home Run Derby with commentators Gary Thorne and Rick Sutcliffe. Managers Kenny Mayne and Harold Reynolds also provided on field reporting. This was the first year in which the teams were designated by the American and National Leagues, as opposed to having a themed names based on the host city. In the bottom of the fourth inning, after three consecutive inside pitches, batter Nick Lachey charged pitcher Goose Gossage resulting in a faux bench clearing. The National League won 15–8.

Lineups

Due to an ankle injury, Swoopes did not play in the game but was brought in as a replacement home plate umpire in the bottom of the fourth inning after a strike call was disputed by celebrity batter Bill Rancic. The original umpire returned for the fifth inning.

2005
The 2005 Taco Bell Legends and Celebrity Softball Game was played on Sunday, July 10, 2005 at Comerica Park in Detroit, Michigan. ESPN broadcast the game after the Home Run Derby with commentators Gary Thorne and Rick Sutcliffe and on field reporter Sam Ryan. The American League won 9–7.

Lineups

2006
The 2006 Taco Bell Legends and Celebrity Softball Game was played on Sunday, July 9, 2006 at PNC Park in Pittsburgh, Pennsylvania. ESPN broadcast the game after the Home Run Derby with commentators Gary Thorne and Rick Sutcliffe. Managers Harold Reynolds and John Kruk also provided on field reporting. The National League won 7–5.

Lineups

2007
AL Rosters: Fred Lynn, Rachel Smith, Kenny Mayne (manager), Jerry Rice, James Denton, Bobby Flay, Sal Iacano, Wade Boggs, Rickey Henderson, Dane Cook, Rollie Fingers, Paul Giamatti, Goose Gossage, Andre Dawson

NL Rosters: Dave Winfield, Jimmy Kimmel (manager), Gary Carter, Robb Nen, J. T. Snow, Rob Scheider, Ernie Banks, Leeann Tweeden, Ozzie Smith, Jeff Garlin, Alyssa Milano, Gavin Newsom, Lisa Guerrero, Gavin Newsom, Kevin Mitchell, Robby Thompson, Matt Williams,

Reporter: Erin Andrews

2008
NL Rosters: Chris Rock, Marlee Manlin, Tim Raines, Ozzie Smith, Bobby Flay, George Lopez, Justin Tuck, Gary Carter, James Denton, A.J. Calloway, Kyle Massey, Paul Molitor, Tony Perez, Mike Greenberg (manager), 
AL Rosters: Maria Menounos, Billy Baldwin, Billy Crystal, Kenny Mayne, Paul O' Neill, Mike Golic (manager), Goose Gossage, Wade Boggs, Rollie Fingers, George Brett, Spike Lee, Whoopi Goldberg, Tino Martinez,

2009
AL Rosters: Ashanti, Shawn Johnson, Andy Richter, Brian Littrell, Kristen Butler, Rollie Fingers, James Denton, Goose Gossage, Fred Lynn, Ginuwine, Mike Golic (Manager), 
NL Rosters: Jenna Fischer, Nelly, Bob Knight, Billy Bob Thornton, Ozzie Smith, Dave Winfield, Ernie Banks, Annie Wersching, Jon Hamm, Chingy, Treena Peel, Megan Gibson, Mike Greenberg (Manager)

2010
AL Rosters: Tim Salmon, Rich Gossage, Bo Jackson, Maria Menounos, James Denton, Rickey Henderson, MC Hammer, Rollie Fingers, Chuck Finley, Marcus Giamatti, Michael Clark Duncan, Kevin Frazier, Natasha Watley, Quintin Aaron, Fred Lynn
NL Rosters: Ozzie Smith, Jennie Finch, John Kruk, Gary Carter, Mario Lopez, Andy Richter, Mike Piazza, Marisa Miller, Guy Fieri, David Nail, Dave Winfield, Jon Hamm, Steve Garvey, Paul Molitor
AL won 15-11

2011
The 2011 Taco Bell Legends and Celebrity Softball Game was played on Sunday, July 10, 2011 at Chase Field in Phoenix, Arizona. ESPN broadcast the game after the Home Run Derby. There were no commentators for the game but managers James Denton and Erin Andrews provided continuous, on field reporting. For this game an inflatable kiddie pool was placed just beyond the shorter softball fence in right-center field as an imitation of the pool just beyond the MLB regulation fence in right-center field. Andrews explained during the telecast that a ball hit into the pool would be worth 4 runs. The National League won 5–3.

Lineups

2012
The 2012 Taco Bell Legends and Celebrity Softball Game was played on Sunday, July 8, 2012 at Kauffman Stadium in Kansas City, Missouri. ESPN broadcast the game after the Home Run Derby with commentators Bill Simmons and John Anderson and on field reporter Tim Kurkjian. In the bottom of the second inning Mike Sweeny, Bill Self, and Chord Overstreet hit back-to-back-to-back home runs, a first in L&S Softball history. This game was the first to feature players from the Wounded Warrior Amputee Softball Team. Saul Bosquez, US Army, Operation Iraqi Freedom, and Matt Kinsey, US Army, Operation Enduring Freedom, are both members of the Washington Nationals WWAST. Bosquez played for the AL and Kinsey played for the NL. Kinsey hit a home run and won the MVP award. The National League won 21–8.

Lineups

Bo Jackson was not in the starting lineup due to a hip injury but pinch hit for Joe Carter in the bottom of the sixth inning. Carter was Jackson's courtesy runner; however, Jackson popped out to shortstop to end the game.

2013
In 2013, the Legends/Celebrities Softball Game was won by the "home team" National League in six innings with a strong performance by Jennie Finch (Olympian Softball Player) who pitched a complete game for the NL.  She was helped offensively from Mike Piazza (New York Mets Legend), Andre Dawson (Legend), and Josh Wege (Wounded Warrior) hitting home runs.  Boomer Esiason (NL manager, television personality) and John Franco (NL co-captain, MLB Legend) were the captains of the victorious National League.  Felipe Eraso (a top fundraiser for All-Star 5k Fun Run) hit an inside-the-ballpark home run also scoring actor George Lopez, due to a missed diving catch attempt in the outfield and an errant throw to American League catcher Ashanti.  Other players for the National League were Alyssa Milano (actress), Kevin James (actor/comedian), and Legends Darryl Strawberry, Ozzie Smith, and Dwight Gooden.  Josh Wege, an amputee wounded in Afghanistan was the co-MVP with Kevin James.

The American League softball team was led by Craig Carton (radio personality/manager) and Bernie Williams (MLB Legend).  Rollie Fingers (MLB Legend) had several costly errors and Ashanti (singer) didn't fare well defensively or at the plate.  Other legends for the AL team included Rickey Henderson, Frank Thomas, and Fred Lynn.  Actors Chord Overstreet (Glee), James Denton (Desperate Housewives), AJ Calloway (Extra), Gary Valentine (Actor/Comedian), and 2013 Miss America Mallory Hagan participated in the game. Actor/Comedian Chris Rock was reportedly scheduled to appear in the softball game, but wasn't shown playing.

2014
In 2014, the Legends/Celebrities softball game was held at Target Field in Minneapolis, Minnesota on Sunday, July 13. ESPN broadcast the game following the live broadcast of the 2014 Major League Baseball Home Run Derby.  This year's game was won by the "away team" National League in six innings with a strong performance by Nelly (rapper) and David Nail (Country Music singer) who both hit two home runs for the NL.

Lineups

2015
The 2015 Legends/Celebrities Game was held at Great American Ball Park in Cincinnati. Vladimir Guerrero was voted MVP as the American guests won.

Lineups

2016
Petco Park in San Diego was where the 16th Legends/Celebrities Softball Game was played.

Lineups

2017
The 17th Celebrities/Legends game was played at Marlins Park in Miami. A 13-run 2nd propelled the Nationals to score a record 28 overall in their victory. The 50 total runs scored by both teams also was a game record. Neither Ozzie Smith nor Rollie Fingers were playing for the first time.

2018
The 18th Celebrities/Legends game was played at Nationals Park in Washington, DC. Quincy Brown, Ashley Greene, Christopher Jackson, Skai Jackson, Taylor Kinney, Tim Kurkjian, Brandon Larracuente, J. R. Martínez, The Miz, Bill Nye, DJ Diesel, Josh Norman, Dascha Polanco, Scott Rogowsky and John Wall joined Foxx among the celebrities participated. Wounded Warriors were Jonathan Herst & Cody Rice.

Jennie Finch & Jessica Mendoza were the starting pitchers. The retired Major Leaguers were André Dawson, Steve Finley, Cliff Floyd, Torii Hunter, Carlos Peña, Tim Raines & Bernie Williams.

Down by 11 to the AL in the bottom of the 6th, the Nationals tried to rally, but came up 4 runs short. And The Miz quickly ended the 5th by retiring the side on one pitch per batter.

2019
The 19th Celebrities/Legends game was played at Progressive Field in Cleveland, OH. Jennie Finch & Jessica Mendoza returned as starting pitchers. The Miz managed Cleveland; celebrity participants included Drew Carey & Kenny Lofton among others.

In that game, the visiting team represents the World team and the host city the home team.

2020
The 20th Celebrities/Legends game was to be played at Dodger Stadium in Los Angeles. That was cancelled and the site deferred to 2022 as the COVID-19 pandemic was to blame.

2021
The 20th Celebrities/Legends game was played at Coors Field in Denver, CO, after the All-Star Game was relocated to Denver from Atlanta. Some of the celebrities who participated in the event were Quavo, Anuel AA, Kane Brown, JoJo Siwa, Jorge Masvidal, Steve Aoki, El Alfa, and Jhay Cortez, among others.

2022
The 21st Celebrities/Legends game was played at Dodger Stadium in Los Angeles, CA, deferred from 2020. The Teams are named the Brooklyn and Los Angeles Dodgers due the Dodgers' History.

Brooklyn won 15-13, and The Miz was voted Most Valuable Player.

Lineups

2023
The 22nd MGM Rewards game will be played at the same site as the inaugural back in 2001: at T-Mobile Park next July.

Results
NOTE: No game in 2020.

References

External links

Major League Baseball All-Star Game
Celebrity competitions
Recurring sporting events established in 2001
Taco Bell
Annual events in Major League Baseball